Kholmogorsky (masculine), Kholmogorskaya (feminine), or Kholmogorskoye (neuter) may refer to:
Kholmogorsky District, a district of Arkhangelsk Oblast, Russia
Kholmogorskaya, a rural locality (a settlement) in Plesetsky District of Arkhangelsk Oblast, Russia
Kholmogorskoye, a rural locality (a selo) in Sharypovsky District of Krasnoyarsk Krai, Russia